Senneterre station is a Via Rail station in Senneterre, Quebec, Canada. It is the final stopover of Via Rail's Montreal–Senneterre train. The station is staffed and is wheelchair-accessible.

External links

Via Rail stations in Quebec
Transport in Abitibi-Témiscamingue
Buildings and structures in Abitibi-Témiscamingue